NGC 7492 is a globular cluster  in the constellation Aquarius. It was discovered by the astronomer William Herschel on September 20, 1786. It resides in the outskirts of the Milky Way, about 80,000  light-years away, more than twice the distance between the Sun and the center of the galaxy, and is a benchmark member of the outer galactic halo. The cluster is immersed in, but does not kinematically belong to, the Sagittarius Stream. 

NGC 7492 possess a tidal tail 3.5 degrees long, embedded into an over-density of stars which may be the remnants of a disrupted dwarf galaxy. The shape of the cluster is flattened rather than spherical, likely due to dynamical interaction with the Milky Way.

References

Globular clusters
Aquarius (constellation)
7492